Dichlorine heptoxide is the chemical compound with the formula Cl2O7. This chlorine oxide is the anhydride of perchloric acid. It is produced by the careful distillation of perchloric acid in the presence of the dehydrating agent phosphorus pentoxide:

2 HClO4 + P4O10 → Cl2O7 + H2P4O11

The chlorine(VII) oxide can be distilled off from the mixture.

It may also be formed by illumination on mixtures of chlorine and ozone. It slowly hydrolyzes back to perchloric acid.

Structure

Cl2O7 is an endergonic molecule, meaning it is intrinsically unstable, decomposing to its constituent elements with release of energy:

2 Cl2O7 → 2 Cl2 + 7 O2 (ΔH° = –132 kcal/mol)

Cl2O7 is bent with Cl−O−Cl angle of 118.6° giving the molecule C2 symmetry. The terminal Cl−O distances are 1.709 Å and the Cl=O distances are 1.405 Å. In this compound, chlorine exists in its highest formal oxidation state of +7, although the bonding in this molecule is significantly covalent.

Chemistry

Dichlorine heptoxide reacts with primary and secondary amines in carbon tetrachloride solution to yield perchloric amides:

2  +  → 2  + 
2  +  → 2  + 

It also reacts with alkenes to give alkyl perchlorates. For example, it reacts with propene in carbon tetrachloride solution to yield isopropyl perchlorate and 1-chloro-2-propyl perchlorate.

Dichlorine heptoxide reacts with alcohols to form alkyl perchlorates.

Dichlorine heptoxide is a strongly acidic oxide, and in solution it forms an equilibrium with perchloric acid.

Safety

Although it is the most stable chlorine oxide, Cl2O7 is a strong oxidizer as well as an explosive that can be set off with flame or mechanical shock, or by contact with iodine. Nevertheless, it is less strongly oxidising than the other chlorine oxides, and does not attack sulfur, phosphorus, or paper when cold. It has the same effects on the human body as elemental chlorine, and requires the same precautions.

References

Chlorine oxides
Oxidizing agents
Acid anhydrides
Acidic oxides
Chlorine(VII) compounds